The UK Albums Chart is one of many music charts compiled by the Official Charts Company that calculates the best-selling albums of the week in the United Kingdom. Since 2004 the chart has been based on the sales of both physical albums and digital downloads. Since 2015, the album chart has been based on both sales and streaming. This list shows albums that peaked in the Top 10 of the UK Albums Chart during 2018, as well as albums which peaked in 2017 and 2019 but were in the top 10 in 2018. The entry date is when the album appeared in the top 10 for the first time (week ending, as published by the Official Charts Company, which is six days after the chart is announced).

One-hundred and fifty-five albums were in the top ten this year. Thirteen albums from 2017 remained in the top 10 for several weeks at the beginning of the year, while 50 Years – Don't Stop by Fleetwood Mac and Unchained Melodies by Roy Orbison with the Royal Philharmonic Orchestra  were both released in 2018 but did not reach their peak until 2019. Christmas by Michael Bublé was originally released in 2011, launched a new chart run in 2017, reaching a peak on its latest run in 2018 and again in 2019.  Dua Lipa by Dua Lipa was the only album from 2017 to reach its peak in 2018. Twelve artists scored multiple entries in the top 10 in 2018. Anne-Marie, Calum Scott, First Aid Kit, The Greatest Showman Cast and XXXTentacion are among the many artists who achieved their first UK charting top 10 album in 2018.

Ed Sheeran's Divide returned to the top of the chart for the opening two weeks of the year, totalling twenty weeks at number-one since it was released in March 2017. The first new number-one album of the year was The Greatest Showman: Original Motion Picture Soundtrack by The Greatest Showman cast. Overall, nineteen different albums peaked at number-one in 2018, with nineteen unique artists hitting that position.

Background

Multiple entries
One-hundred and fifty-five albums charted in the top 10 in 2018, with one-hundred and thirty-nine albums reaching their peak this year (including the re-entries Appetite for Destruction, Christmas, ABBA Gold: Greatest Hits, Mamma Mia! The Movie Soundtrack, Wanted on Voyage, The White Album, X, which charted in previous years but reached peaks on their latest chart run).

Twelve artists scored multiple entries in the top 10 in 2018.

Chart debuts
Thirty-four artists achieved their first top 10 album in 2018 as a lead artist. The Mamma Mia! film cast had one other entry in their breakthrough year.

The following table (collapsed on desktop site) does not include acts who had previously charted as part of a group and secured their first top 10 solo album, or featured appearances on compilations or other artists recordings. 
 

Notes
Camila Cabello's self-titled album Camila, was her first solo effort and her first top 10 album away from the group Fifth Harmony. She reached the top 10 with her bandmates when 7/27 peaked at number six in June 2016. The group had a second top 10 album in 2017 after Camila had left the lineup. Beth Hart collaborated with Joe Bonamassa on a first top 10 album together, Black Coffee. Bonamassa had reached the top ten with three albums previously, the best performing Driving Towards the Daylight making number two in 2012.

Three former members of UB40 - Ali Campbell, Terence Wilson (Astro) and Mickey Virtue - reunited in 2014 under the name UB40 featuring Ali, Astro & Mickey. Their 2018 album A Real Labour of Love was their first to reach the top 10. As a solo artist, Ali had recorded two top 10 albums to date - Big Love (number 6 in 1995) and Running Free (number 9 in 2007).

Rick Parfitt was part of the line-up of Status Quo, who had eighteen studio albums that reached the top 10. He achieved a posthumous top 10 album as a solo artist in 2018 with Over and Out. Sting, the long-standing member of The Police, and soloist Shaggy collaborated for the album 44/876, their first entry as a duo.

The Carters are husband and wife musicians Jay-Z and Beyoncé who have both achieved almost two decades of album chart success individually, the latter also as a member of the group Destiny's Child. However Everything Is Love marked their chart debut as a combined act.

Soundtracks
Soundtrack albums for various films entered the top 10 throughout the year. These included A Star Is Born, Bohemian Rhapsody, The Greatest Showman, Mamma Mia! and Mamma Mia! Here We Go Again.

Best-selling albums
The Greatest Showman cast had the best-selling album of the year with The Greatest Showman: Original Motion Picture Soundtrack. The album spent 87 weeks in the top 10 (52 this year, including 23 weeks at number one), recorded over 1.6 million combined sales and was certified 5× platinum by the BPI. Staying at Tamara's by George Ezra came in second place. Ed Sheeran's ÷, Mamma Mia! Here We Go Again: The Movie Soundtrack from the Mamma Mia! Here We Go Again Cast and Scorpion by Drake made up the top five. Albums by Post Malone, Bradley Cooper & Lady Gaga, Michael Bublé, Dua Lipa and Eminem were also in the top ten best-selling albums of the year.

Top-ten albums
Key

Entries by artist

The following table shows artists who have achieved two or more top 10 entries in 2018, including albums that reached their peak in 2017. The figures only include main artists, with featured artists and appearances on compilation albums not counted individually for each artist. The total number of weeks an artist spent in the top ten in 2018 is also shown.

Notes

 Glory Days re-entered the top 10 at number 10 on 18 January 2018 (week ending) for 2 weeks.
 Human re-entered the top 10 at number 4 on 1 March 2018 (week ending) for 4 weeks.
 Gang Signs & Prayer re-entered the top 10 at number 10 on 1 March 2018 (week ending) for 2 weeks.
 ÷ re-entered the top 10 at number 7 on 6 September 2018 (week ending), at number 9 on 20 September 2018 (week ending) and at number 10 on 24 January 2019 (week ending).
 Dua Lipa re-entered the top 10 at number 10 on 25 January 2018 (week ending) for 4 weeks, at number 3 on 1 March 2018 (week ending) for 7 weeks, at number 8 on 26 April 2018 (week ending) for 5 weeks and at number 9 on 24 January 2019 (week ending).
 Beautiful Trauma re-entered the top 10 at number 9 on 15 February 2018 (week ending) for 5 weeks.
 The Thrill of It All re-entered the top 10 at number 6 on 8 March 2018 (week ending) for 3 weeks, at number 10 on 5 April 2018 (week ending) for 2 weeks and at number 10 on 26 April 2018 (week ending).
 Reputation re-entered the top 10 at number 8 on 11 January 2018 (week ending) for 3 weeks.
 Diamonds re-entered the top 10 at number 10 on 11 January 2018 (week ending).
 Christmas originally peaked at number 1 on 26 November 2011 (week ending) upon its initial release. It re-entered the top 10 at number 10 on 23 December 2017 (week ending), rising to number 8 on 4 January 2018 (week ending). It re-entered the top 10 again later in the year at number 7 on 13 December 2018 (week ending), peaking at number 5 on its current run on 3 January 2019 (week ending).
 × originally peaked at number 1 on 5 July 2014 (week ending) upon its initial release. It re-entered the top 10 at number 10 on 8 March 2018 (week ending) and at number 10 on 29 March 2018 (week ending).
 Question Mark re-entered the top 10 at number 9 on 28 June 2018 (week ending) for 2 weeks, at number 10 on 19 July 2018 (week ending) and at number 10 on 2 August 2018 (week ending).
 Staying at Tamara's re-entered the top 10 at number 6 on 11 October 2018 (week ending) for 5 weeks and at number 9 on 6 December 2018 (week ending) for 7 weeks.
 Wanted on Voyage originally peaked at number-one upon its initial release in 2014. 
 Beerbongs & Bentleys re-entered the top 10 at number 10 on 6 September 2018 (week ending).
 Speak Your Mind re-entered the top 10 at number 10 on 28 June 2018 (week ending) for 2 weeks.
 High as Hope re-entered the top 10 at number 10 on 9 August 2018 (week ending).
 Night & Day was released in two parts, titled Night Edition and Day Edition. Night Edition peaked at number-one in 2017, with Day Edition reaching number 2 this year. The Official Charts website marks this as a re-entry but they were actually separate releases.
 Mamma Mia! Here We Go Again: The Movie Soundtrack re-entered the top 10 at number 9 on 10 January 2019 (week ending) for 3 weeks.
 Mamma Mia! The Movie Soundtrack was ineligible for the Official Album Chart when it was first released in 2008 to support the film Mamma Mia!, but it did top the Official Soundtrack Chart for fifteen consecutive weeks that year.
 Gold: Greatest Hits originally peaked at number-one upon its initial release in 1992. It re-entered the top 10 due to the film Mamma Mia! Here We Go Again.
 Always In Between re-entered the top 10 at number 7 on 10 January 2019 (week ending) for 5 weeks and at number 10 on 21 February 2019 (week ending) and at number 7 on 7 March 2019 (week ending) for 2 weeks.
 Bohemian Rhapsody re-entered the top 10 at number 5 on 29 November 2018 (week ending) for 4 weeks, at number 9 on 3 January 2019 (week ending) for 26 weeks and at number 7 on 18 July 2019 (week ending) for 4 weeks (as of 8 August 2019, week ending).
 The Platinum Collection originally peaked outside the top 10 at number 63 upon its initial release in 2000. It charted in the top 10 for the first time in 2002, peaking at number 2. It re-entered the top 10 at number 10 on 17 January 2019 (week ending) and the same position on 31 January 2019 (week ending) for 2 weeks. It re-entered again at number 9 on 21 February 2019 (week ending) for 4 weeks.
 You Know I Know re-entered the top 10 at number 10 on 27 December 2018 (week ending) for 3 weeks.
 The Beatles (The White Album) originally peaked at number-one upon its initial release in 1968.
 LM5 re-entered the top 10 at number 10 on 20 December 2018 (week ending).
 A Brief Enquiry into Online Relationships re-entered the top 10 at number 10 on 7 March 2019 (week ending).
 Figure includes an album with the Mamma Mia! film cast.
 Figure includes album that peaked in 2017.
 Figure includes an album with the group The Beatles.
 Figure includes an album with the group Guns N' Roses.

See also
2018 in British music
List of UK Albums Chart number ones of the 2010s

References
General

Specific

External links
2018 album chart archive at the Official Charts Company (click on relevant week)

United Kingdom top 10 albums
Top 10 albums
2018